Roslyn Maria Abrams (born September 7, 1948) is an American former television news journalist. She had a long career as an anchor on Eyewitness News, which is broadcast by WABC-TV, working in Manhattan. More recently she worked for WCBS-TV, also in Manhattan, from 2004 to 2006.

Early life and education
Abrams holds a Bachelor of Science degree from Western Michigan University, a master's degree from the University of Michigan and an honorary doctorate of human letters from New York Institute of Technology.

Career
Abrams received a New York Association of Black Journalists Award for the special "The Sounds of Harlem." She has been part of award-winning coverage for some of the biggest stories of our time, including 9/11, the Blackout of 2003, the end of apartheid in South Africa, the Chernobyl nuclear disaster, and AIDS. She worked at WSB-AM radio from 1975 to 1978. She worked on television at WXIA-TV from 1978 to 1982, at CNN from 1982 to 1983, and at KRON-TV from 1983 to 1986.

In December 2003, Abrams was named to the Editorial Advisory Board of "Making Waves," the new quarterly publication of American women in radio and television. She is the current co-chair of NY READS TOGETHER a program sponsored by the New York Women's Agenda.

New York

WABC-TV and WCBS-TV
Before joining WCBS-TV in 2004, Abrams had spent 18 years at WABC-TV, beginning in February 1986, first as a general reporter and later as 5 p.m. co-anchor. The quick move began Abrams's long association with the station. Her last partner at WABC-TV was Diana Williams, beginning in 2003. In 2003, she was offered a contract by WCBS-TV to anchor CBS 2 News at 5 and 11.

Abrams then joined WCBS-TV as the co-anchor of "CBS2 News" at 5 and 11 p.m. on April 19, 2004. First she was paired with veteran New York news anchor Ernie Anastos, who had co-anchored WABC Eyewitness News with her in the 1980s, and then with Jim Rosenfield. In April 2006, she was moved from 11 p.m. to noon, co-anchoring with Mary Calvi. Abrams was replaced at 11 p.m. with veteran Dana Tyler (whom Abrams had replaced at 11 p.m. upon joining WCBS in 2003). In November 2006, however, Abrams left the air after WCBS-TV sports anchor Chris Wragge and newly hired Kristine Johnson (formerly of NBC News and MSNBC) became the anchors at noon and 5 p.m. (and eventually moved from noon to 11 p.m.).  According to the New York Post, Ms. Abrams was last reported as "currently sitting out her contract – and collecting what's believed to be roughly $6 million that's due to her."

In popular culture
 In 2005, Abrams appeared as herself during a brief news segment in the feature film War of the Worlds, an adaptation of H. G. Wells novel of the same name, directed by Steven Spielberg and starring Tom Cruise.
 Abrams appeared in the 2008 film Pride and Glory, starring Ed Norton and Colin Farrell.

See also
 New Yorkers in journalism

References

External links
Announcement of Abrams's New Assignment
Private moments: Roz Abrams, anchorwoman on ABC's 'Eyewitness News
Women Shaping the World: Roz Abrams

1948 births
Journalists from Michigan
Living people
Television anchors from New York City
New York (state) television reporters
People from Lansing, Michigan
Television anchors from San Francisco
University of Michigan alumni
Western Michigan University alumni
American women television journalists
People from Briarcliff Manor, New York
21st-century American women